San Savino may refer to:
 Sabinus of Spoleto (died ca. 300), Italian saint
 Costa San Savino, in the comune of Costacciaro in the Province of Perugia, Umbria (Italy)
 Monte San Savino, a commune in the Province of Arezzo, Tuscany (Italy)
 San Savino, a frazione of Magione, Umbria (Italy)